Iara Lopes Vargas (October 29, 1921 - March 16, 2007) was a Brazilian philosopher and politician. She was one of the founders of the Democratic Labour Party (PDT) and state deputy of Guanabara and of Rio de Janeiro.

Besides, she was niece of Getúlio Vargas.

References 

1921 births
2007 deaths
People from São Borja
20th-century Brazilian women politicians
Democratic Labour Party (Brazil) politicians
Brazilian Labour Party (historical) politicians
Members of the Legislative Assembly of Rio de Janeiro

Iara Vargas